Khomiran (also Romanized as Khomīrān and Khomeyrān; also known as Khumaran) is a village in Chahar Farizeh Rural District, in the Central District of Bandar-e Anzali County, Gilan Province, Iran. At the 2006 census, its population was 405, in 131 families.

References 

Populated places in Bandar-e Anzali County